The 1957 Macdonald Brier, the Canadian men's national curling championship, was held from March 4 to 7, 1957 at Kingston Memorial Centre in Kingston, Ontario. A total of 19,000 fans attended the event.

Team Alberta, who was skipped by Matt Baldwin won the Brier Tankard by finishing round robin play unbeaten with a 10–0 record. This was Alberta's sixth Brier championship and the second time Baldwin had won a title as a skip, with his first coming in 1954. It was also the tenth time in which a team finished a Brier undefeated.

Saskatchewan's 30–3 victory over New Brunswick in Draw 2 set a Brier record for most points scored in a game by one team (30) and the largest margin of victory in a game (27). This broke the previous records of set in 1934 by Ontario in their 26–2 victory over Nova Scotia. The game also tied the record set in 1932 for most combined points by both teams in a game (33). To date, the 30 points scored by Saskatchewan is still a Brier record.

This Brier also at the time broke a record for most extra ends played in a single Brier with eight. This broke the previous record of six set in 1931.

Teams
The teams are listed as follows:

Round-robin standings

Round-robin results
All draw times are listed in Eastern Time (UTC-05:00)

Draw 1
Monday, March 4 3:00 PM

Draw 2
Monday, March 4 8:00 PM

Draw 3
Tuesday, March 5 9:30 AM

Draw 4
Tuesday, March 5 2:30 PM

Draw 5
Wednesday, March 6 3:00 PM

Draw 6
Wednesday, March 6 8:00 PM

Draw 7
Thursday, March 7 9:00 AM

Draw 8
Thursday, March 7 3:00 PM

Draw 9
Thursday, March 7 8:00 PM

Draw 10
Friday, March 8

Draw 11
Friday, March 8

References

External links 
 Video: 

Macdonald Brier, 1957
Macdonald Brier, 1957
The Brier
Curling competitions in Ontario
Macdonald Brier
Macdonald Brier
Sport in Kingston, Ontario